People's, branded as People's Viennaline until May 2018, and legally Altenrhein Luftfahrt GmbH, is an Austrian airline headquartered in Vienna. It operates scheduled and charter passenger flights mainly from its base at St. Gallen-Altenrhein Airport in Switzerland.

History
Founded as People's Viennaline in 2010, the first revenue flight of the company took place on 27 March 2011. For several years, People's only operated a single scheduled route between its homebase and Vienna. However, the route network has since been expanded with some seasonal and charter services.

In November 2016, People's inaugurated the world's shortest international jet route (and, after St. Maarten-Anguilla, second shortest international route overall). The flight from St. Gallen-Altenrhein Airport, Switzerland, to Friedrichshafen Airport, Germany, took only eight minutes of flight over Lake Constance and could have been booked individually. The airline faced severe criticism for this service from politicians and environmental organisations. This leg was part of its then new St.Gallen/Altenrhein-Friedrichshafen-Cologne/Bonn service. However, this entire route has been terminated entirely by the mid of April 2017 due to low passenger numbers. Shortly after, the airline announced plans to terminate its last remaining route from Friedrichshafen (to Vienna) as well.

In May 2018, People's Viennaline announced a rebrand to the shortened People's in order to reflect their widened route network.

In October 2019, the airline announced major restructuring measures mainly consisting of the phase-out of one of their two Embraer 170 aircraft and the closure of all charter operations outside of their St. Gallen-Althenrhein base.

Destinations

Current destinations

As of October 2019, People's operates one year-round scheduled route and some seasonal scheduled and charter services:

Austria
Vienna - Vienna International Airport

Croatia
Pula - Pula Airport, seasonal

Greece
Cephalonia - Cephalonia International Airport, seasonal
Preveza - Aktion National Airport, seasonal

Italy
Cagliari - Cagliari Elmas Airport, seasonal charter
Olbia - Costa Smeralda Airport, seasonal charter
Naples - Naples International Airport, seasonal

Spain
Palma de Mallorca - Palma de Mallorca Airport, seasonal
Ibiza - Ibiza Airport, seasonal
Menorca - Menorca Airport, seasonal

Switzerland
St. Gallen - St. Gallen-Altenrhein Airport, base

Terminated destinations
Bern - Bern Airport, seasonal charter
Corsica - Calvi – Sainte-Catherine Airport, seasonal charter
Memmingen - Memmingen Airport, seasonal charter
Salzburg - Salzburg Airport, seasonal charter
Zurich - Zurich Airport, seasonal charter

Fleet
As of November 2022, People's operates the following aircraft:

References

External links

Official website

Airlines of Austria
Airlines established in 2010